KAJK (96.3 FM) is a radio station licensed to Susanville, California, United States. It serves Lassen County, California. The station is owned by Independence Rock Media Group, through licensee Independence Rock Media, LLC. That company is in turn partially owned by Gary Katz.

External links

AJK
Jack FM stations
Radio stations established in 2005
Lassen County, California